The Monmouth Oaks is an American Thoroughbred horse race held annually at Monmouth Park Racetrack in Oceanport, New Jersey for three-year-old fillies. Named for England's Epsom Oaks, first run in 1779, the inaugural American edition took place in 1871. Originally raced over a distance of  miles from 1871 through 1877, there was no race in 1878 but on its return the following year was modified to  miles.

In 1891, the New Jersey Legislature began a move to ban parimutuel betting and the Oaks had to be moved to the Jerome Park Racetrack in The Bronx, New York. With a legislated permanent ban, after the 1893 running the Monmouth Park Racetrack was shut down and the property sold. In 1946, Thoroughbred racing returned to a new Monmouth Park racing facility. The revived Monmouth Oaks was set at 1 1/16 miles.

Historical notes
Over the years, the Oaks has been won by some of the best fillies in the United States including U.S. Racing Hall of Fame inductees, Dark Mirage (1968), Gallant Bloom (1969) and Desert Vixen (1973).

The inaugural running at the Long Branch track took place on July 6, 1871 and the mile and one-half race was won by Kentuckian Abraham Buford's Salina, a daughter of Lexington and out of the mare Lightsome by Glencoe.

In winning the 1956 edition of the Monmouth Oaks, Levee's time of 1:48 4/5 broke the track record for a mile and one-eighth on dirt.

In 1969 Gallant Bloom earned her fourth straight win of the year, capturing the Oaks by 12 lengths.

Spain won the 2000 running of the Monmouth Oaks then went on to win that year's Breeders' Cup Distaff for owner Prince Ahmed bin Salman's The Thoroughbred Corp. Spain retired as the richest mare in North American racing history.

Records
Speed record:
 1:41.54 @ 1-1/16 miles: Shahama. (2022)
 1:48.00 @ 1-1/8 miles: Golden Horde (1985) & Without Feathers (1987)
 2:12.50 @ 1-1/4 miles: Firenze (1887)
 2:42.00 @ 1-1/2 miles: Woodbine (1872)

Most wins by a jockey:
 5 - Eddie Arcaro (1947, 1949, 1950, 1954, 1955)

Most wins by a trainer:
 5 - Todd A. Pletcher (2004, 2006, 2011, 2016, 2022)

Most wins by an owner:
 3 - August Belmont Sr. (1872, 1876, 1890)
 3 - Pierre Lorillard IV (1877, 1882, 1885)

Winners

 † $ value reported is winners share of the purse from inception in 1871 thru 1893.

References

Grade 3 stakes races in the United States
Horse races in New Jersey
Flat horse races for three-year-old fillies
Monmouth Park Racetrack
Recurring sporting events established in 1871
1871 establishments in New Jersey